This is a list of hills and mountains in Denmark.

Hills in Denmark
This table lists only hills in the country of Denmark, excluding Danish territories (Faroe Islands and Greenland). The listing only considers natural formations.

Mountains in Danish territories

 Gunnbjørn, Greenland, 3700 m. Highest mountain in the Kingdom of Denmark.

References

 
Denmark
Hills
Denmark